Chaudhry Zulfiqar Ali Bhindar  is a Pakistani politician who has been a member of the National Assembly of Pakistan  since August 2018.

Political career
He was elected to the National Assembly of Pakistan from Constituency NA-83 (Gujranwala-V) as a candidate of Pakistan Muslim League (N) (PML-N) in 2018 Pakistani general election.

References

Living people
Pakistani MNAs 2018–2023
1996 births